Pirkko-Liisa Lehtosalo-Hilander is a Finnish archaeologist. She has focused specifically on the Finnish Viking Age and the period of the Crusades, i.e. the 11th, 12th and 13th century religious military campaigns.

Lehtosalo-Hilander has worked extensively e.g. with the Luistari Burial Ground in Eura, Southern Finland. The Luistari site is the largest known Iron Age burial ground in Finland. The site has served also as a place of residence already in the Bronze Age, but the remains of the residence/residences have been nearly entirely destroyed later when the burial ground was built.

Archaeologists have investigated already over 1300 graves of adults and children at the Luistari site. Based on the excavations, the burials were made between the years 500 AD and 1200 AD. Archaeologists have found several remains of clothing, jewelry and other items at the Luistari site.

Lehtosalo-Hilander has also focused on ancient Finnish dresses. Costumes have been made according to dress fragments found in prehistoric graves. These costumes have become the festal garments of many Finnish women.

Bibliography
Ancient Finnish Costumes., 1984, Vammala. 
Savon historia (History of Savonia), Part I, Pirkko-Liisa Lehtosalo-Hilander, Kauko Pirinen, Kustannuskiila Oy, Kuopio, Savon Sanomain Kirjapaino Oy, 1988.
Luistari - A History of Weapons and Ornaments. Luistari IV., 2000, Finska Fornminnesföreningens Tidskrift, no. 107. Helsinki. 
Kalastajista kauppanaisiin: Euran esihistoria ("From Fishermen to Businesswomen: Prehistory of Eura"), 2000.
Viikinkejä Eurassa? ("Vikingar i Eura?"), by Pirkko-Liisa Lehtosalo-Hilander and Sirpa Wahlqvist, 2001.

References

Finnish archaeologists
Living people
Year of birth missing (living people)
Finnish women archaeologists